The men's 200 metre butterfly event at the 1980 Summer Olympics was held on 20 July at the Swimming Pool at the Olimpiysky Sports Complex.

Records
Prior to this competition, the existing world and Olympic records were as follows.

Results

Heats

Final

References

B
Men's events at the 1980 Summer Olympics